Mikey Erg (real name Mike Yannich) is a punk rock drummer, guitarist, and vocalist, from New Jersey. He has played in numerous bands, most famously The Ergs!, but also Star Fucking Hipsters, The Dopamines, The Unlovables, Dirtbike Annie, Parasites, and The LLC (the house band on The Chris Gethard Show). In 2016, he released his first solo album, Tentative Decisions.

In 2013, a change.org petition was started to have Erg fill the vacant drummer slot in Against Me!. Although Atom Willard was eventually given the position, the petition caught the attention of the band's front-woman Laura Jane Grace, who then recorded a four song demo with Mikey for a project unrelated to Against Me!

Discography

References 

21st-century American drummers
21st-century American male musicians
American male drummers
American punk rock drummers
American rock drummers
Don Giovanni Records artists
Living people
Musicians from New Jersey
Year of birth missing (living people)
Star Fucking Hipsters members